Mean Business on North Ganson Street is a 2014 crime thriller novel written by S. Craig Zahler and published by Thomas Dunne Books. The plot concerns a detective named Jules Bettinger who relocates to Victory, Missouri, a collapsed Rust Belt city, where he and his new partner investigate a double homicide in which two policemen were killed—an event that might be the beginning of a series of executions.

Mean Business was nominated for the Spur and Peacemaker awards, and received a starred review for excellence by Booklist and praise from Kirkus Review.

In 2013, Warner Bros. reportedly acquired the rights to the novel to make it into a feature film with Leonardo DiCaprio and Jamie Foxx.

References 

2014 American novels
American crime novels
American thriller novels
Novels set in Missouri
Thomas Dunne Books books